Keon Johnson may refer to:

 Keon Johnson (basketball, born 1995), American basketball player who attended Winthrop University
 Keon Johnson (basketball, born 2002), American basketball player in the NBA